Hind Rassam Culhane is an Iraqi-born American educator and former journalist.

Early life and education 
Rassam Culhane was born in Mosul, Iraq, to an Iraqi-Assyrian father and a Lebanese mother. As a child, she and her family moved to the United States. Rassam Culhane studied at Cazenovia College before earning a bachelor's degree in psychology and a master's degree in early childhood education from Rockford College.

Career 
Rassam Culhane moved to New York City with her husband and worked at Newsweek. She later became a professor at Mercy College and began her doctorate at Teachers College, Columbia University.
She often gives lectures on Iraq's history and civilization as a way of embracing her culture and heritage. 

She is the chair of the Division of Social and Behavioral Sciences at Mercy College. She was also a teacher at the Damascus University - Faculty of Medicine, where she taught courses on child development, adolescent disorders and health service delivery.

Personal life 
Rassam Culhane met her husband, John Culhane, while attending college. They had two children together, Michael and Thomas. John Culhane died in 2015 at the age of 81.

References

Year of birth missing (living people)
Living people
Iraqi educators
Women educators
American people of Iraqi-Assyrian descent
American people of Lebanese descent
Cazenovia College alumni
Mercy College (New York) faculty
Iraqi emigrants to the United States
People from Mosul
Rockford University alumni
Teachers College, Columbia University alumni
Iraqi sociologists
Iraqi women sociologists
20th-century Iraqi educators
21st-century Iraqi educators